Daniel Avery may refer to:

Daniel Avery (politician) (1766–1842), American politician from New York
Daniel Avery (Latter Day Saints) (1798–1851), American Mormon leader
Daniel Avery (musician), English electronic musician